Jacque Harold MacKinnon (November 10, 1938 – March 6, 1975) was an American professional football player who was a tight end, playng most of his career in the American Football League (AFL) with the San Diego Chargers. He also was a member of the Oakland Raiders in the National Football League (NFL) and the Southern California Sun in the World Football League (WFL). He played college football at Colgate University.

Early years
Born and raised in Dover, New Jersey, MacKinnon attended Dover High School. He was a running back in football, a sprinter in track and a center in basketball.

He accepted a football scholarship from Colgate University, where he was a standout at halfback.

Professional career
MacKinnon was selected by the San Diego Chargers in the 33rd round (264th overall) of the 1962 AFL Draft and the Philadelphia Eagles in the 20th round (280th overall) of the 1961 NFL Draft. As the last player selected in the 1961 NFL Draft, he was designated Mr. Irrelevant, however, he is the only such player ever to be eventually selected as an All-Star.

He opted to sign with the San Diego Chargers of the American Football League to play as a fullback. In  1966, he was moved to tight end to take advantage of his blocking and receiver skills. Head coach, Sid Gillman, employed MacKinnon with Dave Kocourek in the first "twin tight-end" formations seen in professional football. He was on the Chargers' 1963 AFL Championship team in their victory over the Boston Patriots. He was an AFL All-Star in 1966 and 1968. In 1968, he averaged 19.6 yards per reception, posting 33 receptions for 646 yards and 6 touchdowns.

On April 29, 1970, he was traded to the Green Bay Packers in exchange for a future draft pick, but he refused to report and instead opted to retire. 

On September 15, 1970, he signed as a free agent with the Oakland Raiders, at the time part of the National Football League. In 1974, he signed with the Southern California Sun in the World Football League to play tight end.

In 1976, he was a part of the initial four former players (along with Emil Karas, Frank Buncom, Bob Laraba), that were inducted posthumously into the San Diego Chargers Hall of Fame.

Personal life
MacKinnon was out of football when he died in 1975.  After fleeing the scene of a car accident and apparently drunk, MacKinnon jumped over a tall fence, not knowing about the construction site on the other side.  MacKinnon fell some 30 feet and died of injuries caused by the fall.

See also 
 List of American Football League players
 List of NCAA major college yearly punt and kickoff return leaders

References

 

1938 births
1975 deaths
People from Dover, New Jersey
Sportspeople from Morris County, New Jersey
Players of American football from New Jersey
American football fullbacks
American football tight ends
Colgate Raiders football players
San Diego Chargers players
Oakland Raiders players
Southern California Sun players
American Football League All-Star players
Accidental deaths from falls
Accidental deaths in California
American Football League players